SallyAnn Harbison  is a New Zealand forensic scientist. She leads the forensic biology team at the Institute of Environmental Science and Research, and is an associate professor at the University of Auckland. Harbison was appointed a Member of the New Zealand Order of Merit in 2021 and in the same year was elected as a Fellow of the Royal Society Te Apārangi.

Academic career 

Harbison grew up in Oxford, but went to university in Liverpool, partly because of her favourite football team. In 1985 she completed a PhD titled Studies on carnation mottle virus at the University of Liverpool's Department of Biochemistry and the John Innes Centre, supervised by Professor Michael Wilson.

Harbison credits Wilson with giving her the confidence to take a postdoctoral position at the University of Auckland, where she worked on the genomics of white clover mosaic virus and genetic modification of clover to breed virus-resistant plants.

In 1988 Harbison moved to the chemistry division of the Department of Scientific and Industrial Research, where she moved into forensic biology. Her work involved crime scene examinations and evidence analysis, such as blood group identification and RNA and DNA profiling, and she worked on the first murder case to be solved using the DNA Profile Databank in 1999. Harbison oversees the DNA profile databank use for cold cases, which has seen convictions in the murder of Teresa Cormack and the 2001 murder of Marie Jamieson. She has supervised more than 60 Masters and PhD students.

Awards 
Harbison was awarded a New Zealand Science and Technology medal in 1996. In the New Years Honours of 2021 she was appointed a Member of the New Zealand Order of Merit (MNZM) for services to forensic science. Also in 2021 she was elected a Fellow of the Royal Society Te Apārangi. Her nomination said "SallyAnn Harbison has led the research and development of significant advances and innovation in forensic DNA and RNA analysis. [She] is recognised internationally for providing casework-ready, accredited science for the justice sector derived from her research activities."

Selected works

References

External links 

 Harbison's new fellow's seminar at the Royal Society Te Apārangi in 2021 
 Interview on Radio New Zealand in 2010

New Zealand academics
New Zealand women academics
Academic staff of the University of Auckland
Alumni of the University of Liverpool
Fellows of the Royal Society of New Zealand
Forensic scientists
Members of the New Zealand Order of Merit
Living people
Year of birth missing (living people)